Delta Sigma was a collegiate sorority operating in New England from 1895 to 1908. Its three chapters were absorbed by Alpha Omicron Pi.

History 
Delta Sigma formed from three local chapters, each of which existed independently for several years.

The oldest was Alpha Delta Sigma. At the end of the spring semester in 1895, six female students at Tufts University drew up plans for a women's fraternity they named Alpha Delta Sigma. In October of the same year, the constitution and bylaws were drafted. Initiations were held on November 14 and December 9 (Start, p. 231). The ΑΔΣ badge was a "square pin of blue enamel displaying the letters". Its official colors (only as a local) were blue and gold (Baird's 1898). This chapter would go on to become the Alpha chapter of Delta Sigma.

Female students at Brown University, approximately 45 miles from Tufts, created Delta Sigma in 1896. Martha Mitchell described the sorority as "formed as a local organization in 1896, [which] merged in 1901 with another local society, Alpha Delta Sigma at Tufts" (Encyclopedia Brunoniana). Similarity in the names appears coincidental. Baird's (1905) described this merger as "the outcome of ΑΔΣ (local at Tufts) and ΔΣ at Brown". Thus, Brown's Delta Sigma became the Beta chapter, while the organization adopted the name and colors of the local at Brown, Delta Sigma. The founding year of 1895 was accepted for the emerging organization.

For several years, the two locals had existed independently of one another, and were listed as such in the 1905 edition of Baird's Manual. That edition listed membership of ΑΔΣ at 33. Yet it also listed Delta Sigma, with Alpha, Beta, and Gamma chapters, separately among the national sororities. This may have been a timing issue or error.  Seventy-seven women were listed as members of the Alpha chapter of Delta Sigma, at Tufts (Baird's 1905, p. 314).

What became the third chapter, at the University of Maine, began as local Phi Gamma in 1896. It joined Delta Sigma as its Gamma chapter in 1903.

Five years later, in 1908, Alpha, Beta, and Gamma were absorbed by Alpha Omicron Pi (Fernald, p. 24). With this merger, Delta Sigma ceased to exist as a separate entity.

Chapter list

Insignia 
The official colors of Delta Sigma were pale green and white.

The flower was the violet (Noted in The Scroll of Phi Delta Theta, 1907).

The badge was "a square of black enamel with concave sides outlined in gold, and displaying the letters 'ΔΣ' in gold. This square is encircled by a jeweled golden circle" (Baird's 1905).

References 

 Fernald, Merritt Caldwell. History of Maine State College and the University of Maine. University of Maine, 1916.
 Mitchell, Martha. Encyclopedia Brunoniana.
 Start, Alaric Bertrand & Tufts University Class of 1897. History of Tufts College. Tufts College, 1896.
 Baird's Manual of American College Fraternities, editions 1898, 1905, and 1915.
 The Scroll of Phi Delta Theta, v. 31 (1906 - 1907).  
 Tufts College Graduate, v. 1-2 (Apr. 1903- Jan. 1905).

Defunct fraternities and sororities
1895 establishments in Massachusetts
Student organizations established in 1895